The Lockheed Altair was a single-engined sport aircraft produced by Lockheed Aircraft Limited in the 1930s. It was a development of the Lockheed Sirius with a retractable undercarriage, and was the first Lockheed aircraft and one of the first aircraft designs with a fully retractable undercarriage.

Development and design
Lockheed designed an alternative wing fitted with a retractable undercarriage for the Lockheed Sirius as a result of a request from Charles Lindbergh, although Lindbergh in the end chose to buy a standard Sirius. The first Altair, converted from a Sirius, flew in September 1930. Like the Sirius, the Altair was a single-engined, low-winged monoplane of wooden construction. The undercarriage, which was operated by use of a hand crank, retracted inwards.

Four Altairs following the prototype were converted Sirii, with another six Altairs built from scratch: three by Lockheed, two by the Detroit Aircraft Corporation, and one by AiRover. The AiRover Altair, dubbed The Flying Testbed, was powered by a Menasco Unitwin engine, which used two engines to drive a single shaft. The Unitwin was used in the Vega Starliner, which never went into production.

Operational history
The prototype Altair was purchased by the United States Army Air Corps and designated Y1C-25, with a second Altair, fitted with a metal construction fuselage was also purchased by the Army as the Y1C-23 and used as a staff transport, as was a single similar aircraft operated by the US Navy as the XRO-1.

Altairs were used to carry out a number of record-breaking long-range flights. One aircraft, named Lady Southern Cross was used by Australian aviator Charles Kingsford Smith to carry out the first flight between Australia and the United States between October  20 and November 4, 1934. Kingsford Smith was killed in the early hours of November 8, 1935, flying Lady Southern Cross during an attempt on the record for flying between England and Australia.

Two Altairs were used by the Japanese newspaper Mainichi Shimbun as high-speed passenger and cargo aircraft, one remaining in use until 1944.

Variants

8D Altair Two-seat long-range high-performance sports aircraft, fitted with a retractable undercarriage, powered by a 500 hp (373 kW) Pratt & Whitney SR-1340E Wasp radial piston engine; One prototype, four converted Sirius aircraft, six production aircraft.
8G Altair One aircraft built by the AiRover Company as a testbed for the Menasco Unitwin 2-544 engine, intended for the Vega Model 2 Starliner. 
Sirius 8 Special One aircraft built for the Australian aviator Charles Kingsford Smith, it was converted into an Altair 8D aircraft, later named the Lady Southern Cross.
DL-2A Two Altair 8Ds built by the Detroit Aircraft Corporation.
Y1C-23 The second Altair 8D was purchased by the US Army Air Corps, it was used as a staff transport aircraft. Later redesignated C-23.
Y1C-25 The Altair 8D prototype was purchased by the US Army Air Corps, powered by a 450 hp (336 kW) Pratt & Whitney R-1340-17 Wasp radial piston engine.
XRO-1 One Altair DL-2A acquired by the U.S. Navy, it was used as staff transport aircraft.

Operators

Mainichi Shimbun

United States Army Air Forces
United States Navy

Specifications (Y1C-23)

See also

References

Notes

Bibliography
 Francillon, René J. Lockheed Aircraft since 1913. Annapolis, Maryland: Naval Institute Press, 1987. .

External links

 Detailed information about Lockheed Altair "Lady Southern Cross".

Altair
1930s United States civil utility aircraft
Single-engined tractor aircraft
Low-wing aircraft
Aircraft first flown in 1930